William Edgar Exshaw (15 February 1866 – 16 March 1927) was a British sailor who competed in the 1900 Summer Olympics.

He was the owner and helmsman of the British/French boat Ollé, which won the gold medals in both races of the 2-3 ton class with crew members Frédéric Blanchy and Jacques Le Lavasseur. He also participated in the open class, but did not finish.

Further reading

References

External links

1866 births
1927 deaths
Olympic gold medallists for Great Britain
Olympic sailors of Great Britain
British male sailors (sport)
People from Arcachon
Sailors at the 1900 Summer Olympics – 2 to 3 ton
Medalists at the 1900 Summer Olympics
Olympic medalists in sailing
Sportspeople from Gironde
British people of French descent